Maurice J. Power (1836 – September 1902) was a New York-based sculptor, politician and owner of the National Fine Art Foundry, New York City.

Biography
Power was born in Rosscarbery, Cork, Ireland. His parents emigrated to Utica, New York when he was 3 years old.  He studied monumental sculpture under Robert Eberhard Launitz, at the same time as Casper Buberl with whom he would later collaborate.  Power continued in this occupation before in 1868 establishing the National Fine Art Foundry, 218 East Twenty Fifth Street, New York.  Many notable works of public art were produced by the foundry including several Civil War battle memorials. 
  
Power entered politics and became involved with Tammany Hall during the William M. Tweed era, later joining the other Democratic Party factions: Irving Hall and the County Democracy, becoming chairman of the latter.  He was a protégé of Samuel J. Tilden, worked for Hubert O Thomson and held public offices including: Police Court Justice for 10 years from 1880, Shipping Commissioner for the Port of New York from 1893 and Aqueduct Commissioner from 1897.

His political influence helped artists such as sculpture William Rudolf O'Donovan gain sponsorship for public works of art, many of which were soldier monuments commemorating the American Civil War.  These were often cast at Power’s foundry.  Power was the artist himself for similar works.

Power died at his home 317 East Nineteenth Street in September 1902.  He wife of 34 years, Mary F O'Brien died in 1911.  They had no children.

References

19th-century American sculptors
1836 births
1902 deaths
American people of Scotch-Irish descent
American political bosses from New York (state)
New York (state) Democrats